The Gold Coast Marathon is an annual road marathon on the Gold Coast, Queensland, Australia, first held in 1979.  Marketed as "Australia's premier road race", the marathon is the only race in Australia to hold World Athletics Label status.  The marathon is held on the first Sunday of July each year, with other races held the day before.

The men's course record of 2:07:50 was set by Yuta Shitara in 2019, while Lindsay Flanagan is the women's course record holder with her run of 2:24:43 in 2022.

History

The inaugural Gold Coast Marathon was held on 2 September 1979 in the suburb of Evandale as part of a health awareness campaign for the Gold Coast. It started and ended at the Evandale Civic Centre and consisted of six laps over Chevron Island Bridge, through Surfers Paradise and over the Isle of Capri Bridge. There were 124 competitors in the marathon, 144 competitors in the half marathon and 423 competitors in an additional fun run. The winning male and female were Eric Sigmont from Victoria and Mary Murison from Lismore.

The 2020 edition of the race was cancelled due to the coronavirus pandemic, with all registrants receiving refunds.  Four days before the scheduled event, the 2021 edition of the race was cancelled due to a three-day snap lockdown in parts of Queensland, including the Gold Coast, that was announced earlier that day.  The lockdown would have ended hours before the start of the event, which would have made attempting to hold the event impractical.

Winners 

Key: Course record (in bold)

See also

Notes

References

External links
Gold Coast Marathon

Marathons in Australia
Sport on the Gold Coast, Queensland
Recurring sporting events established in 1979
1979 establishments in Australia
Annual sporting events in Australia
Athletics in Queensland
July sporting events